Sandun Dias (born 29 July 1985) is a Sri Lankan cricketer. He made his first-class debut for Nondescripts Cricket Club in the 2003–04 Premier Trophy on 14 November 2003. He made his Twenty20 debut on 17 August 2004, for Tamil Union Cricket and Athletic Club in the 2004 SLC Twenty20 Tournament.

References

External links
 

1985 births
Living people
Sri Lankan cricketers
Galle Cricket Club cricketers
Negombo Cricket Club cricketers
Tamil Union Cricket and Athletic Club cricketers
Place of birth missing (living people)